Ardeshiri-ye Sofla (also Romanized as Ardeshīrī-ye Soflá; also known as Ardeshīrī-ye Ḩoseynābād and Ardeshīrī-ye Pā’īn) is a village in Sornabad Rural District, Hamaijan District, Sepidan County, Fars Province, Iran. At the 2006 census, its population was 141, in 35 families.

References 

Populated places in Sepidan County